Trust and Care Sports Club (commonly known as TC Sports Club) is a Maldivian professional football club based in Malé. They have qualified for the Dhivehi League for the first time, after crowning the 2014 Second Division Football Tournament and securing their place at second, in the Play-off for 2015 Dhivehi League.

History

Continental history

Honours
Sheikh Kamal International Club Cup
Champions (1): 2017

Current squad
''Squad for the 2020 AFC Cup

References

External links

Football clubs in the Maldives
Dhivehi Premier League clubs